Benkadi is a rural commune in the Cercle of Dioïla in the Koulikoro Region of south-western Mali. The main village (chef-lieu) is Kotoula.

References

External links
.

Communes of Koulikoro Region